Pomaranča (trans. "Orange"), signed as Orange on their English language releases, is a Slovenian and Yugoslav heavy metal band formed in Ljubljana in 1981. The band was one of the most notable acts of the Yugoslav heavy metal scene.

Band history
Pomaranča was formed in 1981 by vocalist Zlatko Magdalenič and guitarist Mijo Popovič. The default lineup of the band featured, beside Magdalenič and Popovič, Tomaž Žontar (keyboards), Marko Herak (bass guitar) and Franc Teropšič (drums). The band performed NWOBHM-inspired heavy metal with blues elements. They released their debut album, entitled Peklenska pomoranča (Hell Orange, a Slovenian translation of Anthony Burgess A Clockwork Orange) in 1981. In the mid-1980s the band's changed their name to Orange and released two English language albums, Madbringer (1983) and Orange III (1985), attempting to achieve international popularity. However, the band did not achieve expected success, and they ended their activity in the late 1980s. The band reunited in the early 1990s with the new vocalist, Boris Krmac, with whom they recorded the album Takoj se dava dol.

Discography

Studio albums
Peklenska pomaranča (1981)
Madbringer (1983)
Orange III (1985)
Takoj se dava dol (1995)

Compilations
Nekaj peklenskih (1993)

Singles
"Soldat" / "Mladost" (1980)
"Alkohol" / "Goba zla" (1981)
"Mleko z noži" / "Krvave čipke" (1981)

References

External links 
Pomaranča at Discogs

Slovenian heavy metal musical groups
Yugoslav heavy metal musical groups
Yugoslav hard rock musical groups
Musical groups from Ljubljana
Musical groups established in 1979
Musical groups disestablished in 1986
Musical groups reestablished in 1994